Hooked! is the third studio album by American singer-songwriter Lucy Woodward. It was released on June 15, 2010 as her debut album for Verve Records. The set's first single, "Slow Recovery" was released to iTunes on May 4, 2010.

The album includes nine original songs and three covers versions ("Sans Souci", "I Wan'na Be Like You (The Monkey Song)" and "Stardust"). Two of the originals ("Slow Recovery" and "Too Much to Live For") had previously appeared on Woodward's second album Lucy Woodward Is...Hot & Bothered but were reworked for this release with different vocals and arrangements. The iTunes version also includes another cover, "Fashion", originally recorded by David Bowie for his album Scary Monsters (And Super Creeps).

Track listing

Singles
"Slow Recovery" (2010)
"Ragdoll" (2010)

References

External links
 

2010 albums
Lucy Woodward albums